The forests of Switzerland are located across much of the country, at elevations up to the tree line, which lies at about 2,000 metres above sea level. They cover 1.3 million hectares or 32% of Switzerland. The most wooded regions of the country are the massifs of the Jura and the Alps. The diversity of the climate in Switzerland favors both deciduous and coniferous forests.

Definition
In Switzerland, the forest is defined as:  This includes:  This excludes: 

The minimum area for a stand of trees to be considered as a forest and not an isolated group is defined by the cantons.

Size and repartition
In 2012, the wooded area in Switzerland occupied . Its distribution in the different geographical areas of the country is 18% in the Jura, 18% on the Swiss Plateau, 19% in the northern Alpine foothills, 31% in the High Alps and 14% on the south side of the Alps. As for its owners, i.e. 29%, belong to approximately 250'000 private owners and  respectively, i.e. 71%, to public owners. In constant evolution, it has increased in size by about 3% since 1991 in a very unequal way depending on the region.

The breakdown and number of private and public owners remains similar to 2012.

Trees
The country's forests are composed of a total wood volume of about 422 million cubic meters. There are 67% softwoods, mainly firs and spruces, and 33% hardwoods, with mainly beech. Since the 2010s, there has been a dominance of mixed stands in Swiss forests, with only 19% pure stands. According to the national forest inventory, 92% of regenerating stands come from natural seeding. There are 120 different forest types in Switzerland.

References

 
Landforms of Switzerland